Man Singh Kinsariya {मान सिंह किनसरिया} (born 5 September 1960) is an Indian politician. He was a Member of the Rajasthan Legislative Assembly, from the BJP representing Parbatsar constituency for two terms from 2008 to 2018.

Early life and education 
Man Singh Kinsariya was born on 5 September 1960 in Kinsariya, किनसरिया village, Parbatsar, District Nagaur, Rajasthan. He was born to Sheshmal Singh Rathore. He was schooled in his village and then obtained his B.Com. at S S Jain Subodh College, Jaipur. He was elected as parshad at Jaipur Nagar Nigam in 1988–93. He was also elected as Pradesh Mantri and Pradesh Mahamantri in Kishan Morcha BJP.

Political career

References 

Living people
Indian politicians
1960 births